Eric Scot Villency (born June 10, 1975) is an American businessman. He serves as the CEO of Villency Design Group, an interior and product design firm.

Career

Design
In 1932, Villency's grandfather, Maurice Villency, started a furniture company in New York City. His grandfather's company became the Villency Design Group, and in 1998, Eric Villency became CEO.

Villency was named "The Wizard of Wellness" by Well + Good  in 2003 and Inc. Magazine named him of the most influential designers to watch in 2016 
In 2001, he was awarded the FIT “All Star Salute” award, recognizing leaders in design and fashion. In 2002, Villency oversaw the launch of the Maurice Villency flagship store, located on 57th street in midtown Manhattan, and launched the company’s first home accessories collection. In 2006, he launched “Villency Atelier”, a workshop dedicated to custom design and fabrication for design professionals. In 2007, Villency was named the recipient of the IFDA “Design Industry” award.  2008 saw the launch of Villency's business initiative, Villency Pure Design, an environmentally responsible and domestically produced collection of furniture. Villency has lectured at Savanah College of Art & Design 

Villency has worked in boutique fitness having designed the Peloton indoor bike, the SoulCycle indoor fitness bike, along with fitness equipment for Rumble.

Writing
Villency is a contributing writer for the Huffington Post.  He has written for The New York Times, Details, Best Life, Women's Health, and Departures.

Personal life
Villency is the son of Rowann, a mixed media artist, and Robert Villency, the chairman of Maurice Villency. Villency is a graduate of the University of Wisconsin.

On May 27, 2006, he married former assistant District Attorney of San Francisco and co-host of The Five on Fox News Kimberly Guilfoyle on the island of Barbados.  On October 4, 2006, Guilfoyle gave birth to their son, Ronan Anthony. On June 23, 2009, it was announced that Guilfoyle and Villency had separated; they divorced in November of that year.

In December 2013, he married Swedish designer Caroline Fare in West Palm Beach. Villency and Fare divorced in 2017.

References

External links
 Eric Villency
 Villency Design Group

Living people
American chief executives
1975 births
Businesspeople from New York City
American interior designers
University of Wisconsin–Madison alumni
20th-century American Jews
21st-century American Jews